Many computer user interfaces use a control panel metaphor to give the user control of software and hardware features. The control panel consists of multiple settings including display settings, network settings, user account settings, and hardware settings. Some control panels require the user to have admin rights or root access.

Computer history
The term control panel was used for the plugboards in unit record equipment and in the early computers of the 1940s and '50s. In the 1980s, the Xerox Star and the Apple Lisa, which pioneered the first graphical user interface metaphors, controlled user settings by single click selections and variable fields. In 1984 the Apple Macintosh in its initial release made use of fundamental graphic representation of a "control panel board" imitating the operation of slider controls, on/off buttons  and radio-select buttons that corresponded to user settings.

Functionality 
There are many tasks grouped in a control panel:

Hardware 
 Color
 Color management
 Computer displays
 Brightness
 Contrast
 Color calibration
 Energy saving
 Gamma correction
 Screen resolution and orientation
 Graphics tablet
 Keyboard
 Shortcuts and bindings
 Language and layout
 Text cursor appearance
 Mouse and touchpad
 Power management
 Energy saving
 Battery usage
 Display brightness
 Power button actions
 Power plans
 Printers and scanners
 Sound

Networking 
 Bluetooth connection and file exchange
 Ethernet connection
 Internet Accounts
 E-mail integration
 Social media integration
 Wi-Fi connection
 System-wide proxy

Security 
 Certificates and password management
 Firewall
 Filesystem encryption
 Privacy
 File indexing and event tracking
 Data sharing

System 
 Login window
 System information
 Hostname
 System time
 Calendar system
 NTP server
 Time zone
 Software management
 Application management
 System update configuration
 Software sources

Different types
In Microsoft Windows operating systems, the Control Panel and Settings app are where various computer settings can be modified.
In the classic Mac OS, a control panel served a similar purpose. In macOS, the equivalent to control panels are referred to as System Preferences.
In web hosting, browser-based control panels, such as CPanel and Plesk, are used to manage servers, web services and users.
 There are different control panels in free desktops, like GNOME, KDE, Webmin...

See also
 Control panel (engineering)
 Dashboard (business)

References

User interfaces